The Wind That Shakes the Barley is a 2006 war drama film directed by Ken Loach, set during the Irish War of Independence (1919–1921) and the Irish Civil War (1922–1923). Written by long-time Loach collaborator Paul Laverty, this drama tells the fictional story of two County Cork brothers, Damien O'Donovan (Cillian Murphy) and Teddy O'Donovan (Pádraic Delaney), who join the Irish Republican Army to fight for Irish independence from the United Kingdom.

The film takes its title from Robert Dwyer Joyce's "The Wind That Shakes the Barley", a song set during the 1798 rebellion in Ireland and featured early in the film. The film is heavily influenced by Walter Macken's 1964 novel The Scorching Wind.

Widely praised, the film won the Palme d'Or at the 2006 Cannes Film Festival. Loach's biggest box office success to date, the film did well around the world and set a record in Ireland as the highest-grossing Irish-made independent film, until surpassed by The Guard.

Plot
County Cork, Ireland, 1920. Damien O'Donovan is about to leave his native village to practice medicine in a London hospital. Meanwhile, his brother Teddy commands the local flying column of the Irish Republican Army. After a hurling match, Damien witnesses the summary execution of his friend, Micheál Ó Súilleabháin, by British Black and Tans, for refusing to say his name in English. Although shaken, Damien rebuffs his friends' entreaties to stay in Ireland and join the IRA, saying that the war is unwinnable. As he is leaving town, Damien witnesses the British Army vainly trying to intimidate a railway personnel for refusing to permit the troops to board. In response, Damien decides to stay and is sworn into Teddy's IRA brigade.

After drilling in the mountains, the column raids the village's Royal Irish Constabulary barracks to acquire revolvers, then uses them to assassinate four Auxiliaries. In the aftermath, Anglo-Irish landowner Sir John Hamilton coerces one of his servants, IRA member Chris Reilly, into passing information to the British Army's Intelligence Corps. As a result, the entire brigade is arrested. In their cell, Damien meets the train driver, Dan, a union official who shares Damien's socialist views.

Meanwhile, British officers interrogate Teddy, pulling out his fingernails when he refuses to give them the names of IRA members. Johnny Gogan, a British soldier of Irish descent, helps the prisoners escape, but three are left behind. After the actions of Sir John and Chris are revealed to the IRA's intelligence network, both are taken hostage. As Teddy is still recovering, Damien is temporarily placed in command. News arrives that the three remaining IRA prisoners have been tortured and shot. Simultaneously, the brigade receives orders to "execute the spies".

Despite the fact that Chris is a lifelong friend, Damien shoots both him and Sir John. Later, the IRA ambushes and wipes out a convoy of the Auxiliary Division, and in retaliation another detachment of Auxiliaries loots and burns the farmhouse of Damien's sweetheart, Cumann na mBan member Sinéad Sullivan. Sinéad is held at gunpoint while her head is roughly shorn, her scalp being wounded in the process. Later, as Damien treats her, a messenger arrives with news of a formal ceasefire between Britain and the IRA.

After the Anglo-Irish Treaty is signed, the brigade learns that a partitioned Ireland will only be granted Dominion status within the British Empire. As a result, the brigade divides over accepting the terms of the Treaty. Teddy and his allies argue that accepting the Treaty will bring peace now while further gains can be made later. Others oppose the Treaty, proposing to continue fighting until a united Irish Republic can be obtained. Dan and Damien further demand the collectivisation of industry and agriculture. Any other course, declares Dan, will change only "the accents of the powerful and the colour of the flag".

Soon the Irish Free State replaces British rule, and Teddy and his allies begin patrolling in National Army uniforms. Meanwhile, Damien and his allies join the Anti-Treaty IRA. When the Battle of Dublin launches the Irish Civil War, the Anti-Treaty column commences guerrilla warfare against Free State forces. As the violence escalates, Teddy expresses fear that the British will invade if the republicans gain the upper hand. His position is: "They take one out, we take one back. To hell with the courts."

Soon after, Dan is killed and Damien is captured during a raid for arms on an Irish Army barracks commanded by Teddy. Sentenced to execution, Damien is held in the same cell where the British Army imprisoned them earlier. Desperate to avoid executing his brother, Teddy pleads with Damien to reveal where the Anti-Treaty IRA is hiding the stolen rifles. In return, Teddy offers Damien full amnesty, a life with Sinéad, and the vision of an Ireland where Pro- and Anti-Treaty Irishmen can raise families side by side. Insulted, Damien responds by saying that he will never "sell out" the Republic the way Chris Reilly did and Teddy leaves the cell in tears. Damien writes a goodbye letter to Sinéad, expressing his love for her, and quoting Dan's words: "It's easy to know what you're against, quite another to know what you're for". But he says that he knows what he stands for and is not afraid to die for it and tells Sinéad to look after Teddy. At dawn, Damien dies before a firing squad commanded by a heartbroken yet obstinate Teddy. Teddy delivers Damien's letter to Sinéad who is distraught and heartbroken. She attacks Teddy and orders him to leave her land.

Main cast

 Cillian Murphy – Damien O'Donovan
 Pádraic Delaney – Teddy O'Donovan
 Liam Cunningham – Dan
 Orla Fitzgerald – Sinéad Ní Shúilleabháin
 Laurence Barry – Micheál Ó Súilleabháin
 Mary Murphy – Bernadette
 Mary O'Riordan – Peggy
 Myles Horgan – Rory
 Martin Lucey – Congo
 Roger Allam – Sir John Hamilton
 John Crean – Chris Reilly
 Damien Kearney – Finbar
 Frank Bourke – Leo
 Shane Casey – Kevin
 Máirtín de Cógáin – Sean
 William Ruane – Johnny Gogan
 Fiona Lawton – Lily
 Seán McGinley – Father Denis
 Kevin O'Brien – Tim

Production
The film stars mostly Irish actors and was made by British director Ken Loach. It is an international co-production between companies in Ireland, United Kingdom, Germany, Italy, Spain, France, Belgium and Switzerland.

The title derives from the song of the same name, "The Wind That Shakes the Barley", by 19th-century author Robert Dwyer Joyce. The song made the phrase "the wind that shakes the barley" a motif in Irish republican song and poetry. Loach took some of the inspiration for Damian's character from the memoirs of republican leader Ernie O'Malley. University College Cork historian Dr. Donal Ó Drisceoil was Loach's historical adviser on the film.

The film was shot in various towns within County Cork during 2005, including Ballyvourney and Timoleague. Some filming took place in Bandon, County Cork: a scene was shot along North Main Street and outside a building next to the Court House. The ambush scene was shot on the mountains around Ballyvourney while the farmhouse scenes were filmed in Coolea. Damien's execution scene was shot at Kilmainham Gaol in Dublin, where many leaders of Irish rebellions were imprisoned and some executed by the British and latterly in 1923 by the Irish Free State.

A number of the extras in the film were drawn from local Scout groups, including from Bandon, Togher and Macroom. Many of the British soldiers seen in the film were played by members of the Irish Army Reserve, from local units.

Among the songs on the film's soundtrack is Óró sé do bheatha abhaile, a 17th-century Irish Jacobite song whose lyrics the nationalist leader Pádraig Pearse changed to focus upon republican themes.

Soundtrack
The Wind That Shakes the Barley - Traditional - Words by Robert Dwyer Joyce
Amhrán na bhFiann (A Soldier's Song) - Traditional - Words by Peadar Kearney & Patrick Heeney
Oró! Sé Do Bheatha 'Bhaile - Traditional - Words by Padraic Pearse
The Doon Reel - Traditional - Arranged by the performers

Distribution
The commercial interest expressed in the UK was initially much lower than in other European countries and only 30 prints of the film were planned for distribution in the United Kingdom, compared with 300 in France. However, after the Palme d'Or award the film appeared on 105 screens across Great Britain and Northern Ireland.
The Respect Party, on whose national council Ken Loach was at the time, called for people to watch the film on its first weekend in order to persuade the film industry to show the film in more cinemas.

Themes
According to director Ken Loach, the film attempts to explore the extent that the Irish revolution was a social revolution as opposed to a nationalist revolution. Loach commented on this theme in an interview with Toronto's Eye Weekly (15 March 2007):

According to Rebecca O'Brien, producer of the film and a longtime Loach collaborator:

Reception
The Wind That Shakes the Barley became the most popular independent Irish film ever released in Ireland, earning €377,000 in its opening weekend and €2.7 million by August 2006.

The film received positive reviews from film critics. As of 2022, the review aggregator Rotten Tomatoes reported that 90% of critics gave the film positive reviews, based on 117 reviews. The website's critical consensus reads, "Bleak and uncompromising, but director Ken Loach brightens his film with gorgeous cinematography and tight pacing, and features a fine performance from Cillian Murphy." Metacritic reported the film had an average score of 82 out of 100, based on 30 reviews.

The Daily Telegraph'''s film critic described it as a "brave, gripping drama" and said that director Loach was "part of a noble and very English tradition of dissent". A Times film critic said that the film showed Loach "at his creative and inflammatory best", and rated it as 4 out of 5. The Daily Record of Scotland gave it a positive review (4 out of 5), describing it as "a dramatic, thought-provoking, gripping tale that, at the very least, encourages audiences to question what has been passed down in dusty history books."

Michael Sragow of The Baltimore Sun named it the 5th best film of 2007, and Stephen Hunter of The Washington Post named it the 7th best film of 2007.

Jim Emerson, Roger Ebert's editor, gave the film a 4 star review, calling it "breathtakingly authentic", and declared it ranked "among the best war films ever made." In a generally positive review, the Irish historian Brian Hanley suggested that the film might have dealt with the IRA's relationship with the Protestant community, as one scene in its screenplay did.

The film also revived debate on rival interpretations of Irish history.

Awards and nominations

References

External links
  
 
 
 
 
 
 Interview with Ken Loach from Socialist Worker'', 10 June 2006
 Introduction to The Wind That Shakes the Barley script by Luke Gibbons, and Gibbons' reply to Kevin Myers

2006 films
2006 drama films
British war drama films
English-language Irish films
English-language French films
English-language German films
English-language Italian films
English-language Spanish films
English-language Swiss films
Films scored by George Fenton
Films about the Irish Republican Army
Films directed by Ken Loach
Films set in the 1920s
Films set in Ireland
Irish Civil War films
Irish drama films
Irish-language films
Irish War of Independence films
Palme d'Or winners
Political drama films
Social realism in film
War romance films
UK Film Council films
Irish Film Board films
2000s British films